Cellvibrio japonicus is a Gram-negative soil bacterium.

External links
Type strain of Cellvibrio japonicus at BacDive -  the Bacterial Diversity Metadatabase

Pseudomonadales
Bacteria described in 2003